Katzelsdorf is a municipality in the district of Wiener Neustadt-Land in Lower Austria, Austria. It is situated at the foot of the Rosalia Mountains, on the river Leitha, 5 km southeast of Wiener Neustadt.

Population

References

External links 
 Katzelsdorf website
 Zinnfigurenwelt

Cities and towns in Wiener Neustadt-Land District
Populated places on the Leitha